The 2018–19 SKNFA Premier League, is the 39th season of the SKNFA Premier League, the top division of football in Saint Kitts, one of the two islands of Saint Kitts and Nevis. The regular season began on 22 September 2018. The 3,500-capacity Warner Park was the main venue for the league.

Regular season

Super 6
SKNFA decided on 22 October 2019 to cancel the Super 6. No champions were declared for this season, and no teams were relegated (league to be expanded to 12 teams next season).

Super 6 stadiums

Championship final

First leg

Second leg

Third leg
Note: If necessary.

Top scorers

References

External links
SKNFA

1
Saint Kitts
SKNFA Super League seasons